is a Japanese musical ensemble and dōjin circle from Sapporo, Japan. The group is primarily known for producing rearrangements of music from the Touhou Project series of dōjin games. They are not signed to a label, instead preferring to release their music through dōjin channels such as the Comiket convention and via their website. Their music frequently parodies characters or themes of games such as those of Touhou Project or Atlus's Etrian Odyssey. Many of the current members reside in the Hokkaidō or Kantō areas of Japan.

Flash videos 
IOSYS is generally best known for the Flash movies that go along with their songs.

The first Flash movie was a music video for their original song "" sang 2channel's culture, and was published in April 2006. It was created by a dōjin animation producer , also known as locker room production.

In May 2006, IOSYS released the first Touhou Project arrangement CD,. ARM, a main composer of IOSYS, recalled that he was interested in dojin music circles competed with each other for arrangements of the same original music. He was inspired by the Touhou Project arrangement song "Help me, EIRINNNNNN!!" created by the dōjin circle COOL&CREATE in 2004.

In August 2006, IOSYS released the second Touhou Project arrangement CD, . In November 2006, they published a promotional video using the second track of the CD, "" whose movie was made by Kagi. It had a positive critical reception from visitors. Flash movies were followed by "" (known in English speaking circles as "Overdrive") from their third Touhou arrangement album,  "" co-worked with COOL&CREATE,  and “”. Their Flash movies and fan-made videos were uploaded to YouTube and Nico Nico Douga. They caused a big sensation among the Japanese Internet forum 2channel, Nico Nico Douga and in other otaku internet circles.

IOSYS also produced the 2nd ending credits for Penguin Musume Heart and composed opening and ending credits music for Yumekui Merry.

Discography 
The name , meaning Eastern, refers to the Touhou Project series.

Reference for discography taken from Videogame Music Database.

01. ファミコンCDDX
Famicom CDDX
Released May 08 2005

02. 東方風櫻宴  (Tōhō Kazakuraen) 
Phantasmagoria Mystical Expectation
Released May 21, 2006
The first IOSYS Touhou Project arrangement CD, mainly instrumental. Only the first and fourth tracks having lyrics.

03. 東方乙女囃子 (Tōhō Otomebayashi)
Touhou Maidens' Orchestra
Released Aug 13 2006
The Otome Bayashi includes one of IOSYS' most famous songs, "Marisa Stole the Precious Thing", but is also mainly instrumental.

04. 東方月燈籠 (Tōhō Tsukitōrō)
Touhou Moon Lantern
Released Dec 31 2006
In this CD, "Stops at the affected area and immediately dissolves ~ Lunatic Udongein" is included. This is the first IOSYS CD in which every track has lyrics but the fourteenth. Was re-released in 2009 as Touhou Moon Lantern (Safe), with certain tracks added/removed.

05. 世界樹のおもちゃ箱 (Sekaiju no Omochabako)
Yggdrasil's Toy Box 
Released Apr 30/2007

06. 東方永雀峰 (Tōhō Eijanho)
Touhou Eternal Sparrow Peak
Released May 20, 2007
This is a rearrange of nearly the entire Touhou Eiyashou soundtrack, with vocals for only 3 tracks. It also features a parody of Marisa Stole the Precious Thing

07. 東方萃翠酒酔 (Tōhō Suisuisūsū)
Touhou Gathering Green Wine Drunkenness
Released Aug 17 2007
In this CD, "Usatei" is included. It was re-arranged by COOL&CREATE themselves, and was exhibited as "" in the Touhou music live event in 2011

08. ごっすんとかのからおけ (Gossun to ka no Karaoke)
Released Nov 11 2007

09. 東方河想狗蒼池 (Tōhō Kasokusōchi)
Touhou Blue Land of Rivers, Visions, and Tengu
Released Dec 31 2007

10. ねこみことかのからおけ (Neko Miko to ka no Karaoke)
Released Mar 03 2008

11. 東方真華神祭 (Tōhō Makashinsai)
Touhou Splendid Divine Festival
Released May 25, 2008

12. ごっすんリミックス　アイン (Gossun Remix Ein)
Released May 25, 2008

13. ごっすんリミックス　ツバイン (Gossun Remix Zwein)
Released May 25, 2008

14. 東方想幽森雛 (Tōhō Sōyūshinpi)
Touhou Such a Mystery
Released Aug 17 2008

15. おさいせんとかのからおけ (Osaisen to ka no Karaoke)
Released Oct 13 2008

16. 東方氷雪歌集 (Tōhō Hyosetsu Kashu)
Touhou Anthology Of Ice And Snow
Released Nov 02 2008

17. 東方泡沫天獄 (Tōhō Hōmatsu Tengoku)
Touhou Bubbling Underground
Released Dec 29 2008

18. 東方超都魔転 (Tōhō Chotto Matten)
Touhou Just A Moment
Released Mar 08 2009

19. bloom
Released Mar 08 2009

20. 東方月燈籠セーフ！
Touhou Moon Lantern Safe!
Released Apr 1 2009
Re-release of 東方月燈籠.

21. 東方年柄年中 (Tōhō Nengaranenju)
Touhou All Year Round
Released Aug 15 2009

22. 東方JeuXinTerdiTs
Touhou JeuXinTerdiTs
Released Dec 12 2009

23. 東方アゲハ (Tōhō Ageha)
Released Feb 14 2010

24. 東方銀晶天獄
Touhou Crystallized Ocean
Released Mar 14 2010

25. 燃えろ！東方ブラスバンド
Moero! Touhou Brass Band
Released May 05 2010

26. 東方 Faithful Star
Touhou Faithful Star
Released July 11, 2010

27. 東方うたうチルノちゃん
Touhou Singing Cirno chan
Released August 14, 2010

28. 東方恋苺娘+
Touhou Love Strawberry Girl +
Released August 14, 2010

29. Touhou IO-BEST BEATS
Released September 19, 2010

30. 東方メリーゴーランド
Touhou Merry-Go-Round
Released September 19, 2010

31. 東方浮思戯革命
Touhou Wonder Revolution
Released October 11, 2010

32. 東方云符不普
(title is sequence of characters that make no literal sense)
Released December 30, 2010

33. イオシス — リ：キャンディッド！ ARM東方リミックス
IOSYS: Candid! ARM Touhou Remix
Released March 13, 2011

34. 東方メレンゲ少女夜行
Touhou Merenge Shoujo Yakou
Released March 13, 2011

35. 東方 Variable Spellcaster
Released May 8, 2011

36. 東方IO-BEST BEATS2
Released May 8, 2011

37. 東方メレンゲ少女夜行
Touhou Meringue Girls Train Ride
Released May 8, 2011

38. Grimoire of IOSYS – 東方BEST ALBUM vol.1
Released July 10, 2011
First IOSYS Best-Of Album.

39. 東方アゲハ DESTINY
Touhou Ageha DESTINY
Released July 10, 2011

40. 俺のチルノがこんなに天才なわけがない
There is no genius like my Cirno
Released August 13, 2011

41. 東方プレシャス流星少女
Touhou Precious Meteor Girls
Released August 13, 2011

42. 東方Reflection of a Drive
Released September 11, 2011

43. 東方テレパス少女歌集
Touhou Telepathic Girls' Anthology
Released October 16, 2011

44. 11.12.30 東方エレクトリック電波少女
Touhou Electric Radio Girl
Released December 30, 2011

45. 東方IO-BEST BEATS3
Released February 12, 2012

46. Grimoire of IOSYS – 東方BEST ALBUM vol.2
Released February 29, 2012
Second IOSYS Best-Of Album.

47. てっぺい先生のパーフェクトヴァイオリン教室
Teppei Sensei's Perfect Violin Class
Released March 10, 2012

48. Quality Underground
Released April 22, 2012

49. 東方紫雨天獄
Touhou Twilight Heaven
Released April 30, 2012

50. 東方アゲハ NIGHTMARE
Touhou Ageha NIGHTMARE
Released May 27, 2012

51. 風櫻 SECOND PHANTASMA
Wind-Cherryblossom SECOND PHANTASMA
Released May 27, 2012

52. 東方うたうちれいでん
Touhou Singing Subterranean Animism
Released July 14, 2012

53. 燃えろ！東方ブラスバンド生
Moero! Touhou Brass Band Live
Released August 11, 2012

54. Quaky Divines
Released September 28, 2012

55. 東方Eternal Fantasia
Released September 28, 2012

56. Night Gypsy - 東方JAZZROCK -
Night Gypsy - Touhou JAZZROCK
Released October 7, 2012

57. 乙女囃子 COLORFUL GIRLS -IOSYS TOHO COMPILATION vol.22-
Maiden's Orchestra COLORFUL GIRLS -IOSYS TOHO COMPILATION vol.22-
Released October 7, 2012

58. Grimoire of IOSYS – 東方BEST ALBUM vol.3
Released November 30, 2012
Third IOSYS Best-Of Album.

59. > TOHO EDM <
Released December 12, 2012

60. ROCKIN'ON TOUHOU VOL.1
Released December 30, 2012

61. re:takes ～best of minami's toho guitar works～
Released February 3, 2013

62. PUNK IT! TOUHOU! -IOSYS HITS PUNK COVERS-
Released March 31, 2013

63. Stellar Nursery
Released March 31, 2013

64. 背徳のファンタスマゴリア
Phantasmagoria of Immortality
Released April 29, 2013

65. ROCKIN'ON TOUHOU VOL.2
Released May 26, 2013

66. RoughSketch TOHO WORKS 2007-2012
Released May 26, 2013

67. げきおこ☆メイガス
Released May 26, 2013

68. Scary Halloween Show
Released October 13, 2013

69. Chinjufu ni Chakunin Shita Kedo Shitsumon Aru? 
Released October 27, 2013

70. Gekikawa☆Vampin
Released December 28, 2013

71. Bauxite ga Soko o Tsuita Kudan
Released January 19, 2014

72. PUNK IT! TOUHOU!2 -IOSYS HITS PUNK COVERS-
Released February 2, 2014

73. NOTHING BUT THE TOHO EDM
Released March 30, 2014

74. ROCKIN'ON TOUHOU VOL.3
Released May 11, 2014

75. HYPER DEMPA COLLECTION -FREEDOM★TOUHOU-HEN-
Released May 11, 2014

76. Hangyaku no Phantasmagoria
Released May 11, 2014

77. PUNK IT! TOUHOU! 3 -IOSYS HITS PUNK COVERS-
Released October 18, 2015

78. IOSYS TOHO MEGAMIX – GENSOKYO HOUSE EDITION –
Released October 18, 2015

79. Haunted Halloween Town
Released October 18, 2015

80. MAGIC TO MUSIC TOHO
Released December 30, 2015

81. げきリミ! -げきおこシリーズリミックス
Geki Remi ─ Gekioko series remix ─
Released December 30, 2015

82. DREAM TO MUSIC TOHO
Released March 13, 2016

83. ROCKIN'ON TOUHOU VOL.5
Released May 5, 2016

84. MIRACLE TO MUSIC TOHO
Released June 19, 2016

85. Touhou Hits Covers -Ska Punk Flavor-
Released August 8, 2016

86. Spooky Halloween Tour
Released October 9, 2016

87. 東方極楽湯界─イオシス東方コンピレーション vol.24─
Released October 10, 2016

88. 東方フリースタイル弾ジョン
Released May 7, 2017

89.東方ゴールデンタイム ─イオシス東方コンピレーション vol.25─
Released May 7, 2017

References

External links
  IOSYS Main Website

Doujin music
Musical groups from Hokkaido